Brian Shulman (born April 20, 1966) is a former football player in the NFL. He was the eight-round draft pick of the Green Bay Packers in 1989, making him the last punter from Auburn University to be drafted into the NFL.

In 2001, Shulman founded LTS Education Systems (formerly Learning Through Sports, Inc.), a company that developed online game-based learning systems for children. LTS was acquired by K12 Inc. in April 2016.

Shulman is also the author of The Death of Sportsmanship and How to Revive It.

Football career
In 1986 Shulman was awarded a scholarship to play football at Auburn University under Coach Pat Dye.  Shulman was the starting punter from 1986 to 1988. He was a captain on Auburn's 1988 team, which won SEC Championship and was named no.1 nationally in scoring defense and total defense. He finished college as a two-time All-Southeastern Conference (SEC) player and was drafted by the Green Bay Packers in 1989 in the 8th round.

References

External links
Brian Shulman website
Website for LTS Education Systems

1966 births
Living people
All-American college football players
American football punters
Green Bay Packers players